"So Good to Me" is a song by American DJ and record producer Chris Malinchak. It was released in the United Kingdom on 5 May 2013 by Ministry of Sound. The song samples "If This World Were Mine" (1967) by Marvin Gaye & Tammi Terrell.

"So Good to Me" debuted and peaked at number two in the United Kingdom, failing to prevent "Get Lucky" by Daft Punk featuring Pharrell Williams from spending a third week at the top of the UK Singles Chart. It also peaked at number four in Belgium and the Republic of Ireland and number seven in the Netherlands.

Critical reception
Lewis Corner of Digital Spy gave the song a positive review stating "The result is a masterclass in restrained euphoria, proving that when it comes to Chris Malinchak, less really is more. ."

Music video
A music video to accompany the release of "So Good to Me" was first released onto YouTube on March 22, 2013 at a total length of two minutes and forty-three seconds. It features a little girl who is trying to find her pet. The pet turns out to be a giraffe (called Stanley), who shows up near the end of the video.

Track listing

Charts and certifications

Weekly charts

Year-end charts

Certifications

Release history

References

2013 singles
Chris Malinchak songs
Songs written by Marvin Gaye
Ministry of Sound singles